René Renoux (1904–2000) was a French art director.

Selected filmography
 The Pure Truth (1931)
 Topaze (1933)
 Prince Jean (1934)
 Speak to Me of Love (1935)
 You Can't Fool Antoinette (1936)
 The Bureaucrats (1936)
 Berlingot and Company (1939)
 First Ball (1941)
 Madly in Love (1943)
 Father Goriot (1945)
 Roger la Honte (1946)
 The Captain (1946)
 Pastoral Symphony (1946)
 The Lame Devil (1948)
 The Ironmaster (1948)
 To the Eyes of Memory (1948)
 Cage of Girls (1949)
 Doctor Laennec (1949)
 At the Grand Balcony (1949)
 The Ladies in the Green Hats (1949)
 The Treasure of Cantenac (1950)
 God Needs Men (1950)
 Deburau (1951)
 Clara de Montargis (1951)
 Love and Desire (1951)
 Burning Fuse (1957)

References

Bibliography 
 Freddy Buache. Claude Autant-Lara. L'AGE D'HOMME, 1982.

External links 
 

1904 births
2000 deaths
French art directors
Film people from Brest, France